Dubové is a village and municipality of the Zvolen District in the Banská Bystrica Region of Slovakia.

History
In historical records, the village was first mentioned in 1225 when King Bela IV donated it to a certain Pertold from Zvolen.  In 1287 it passed to a certain Termanus, knight Arnold's son from Banská Štiavnica. After on, it belonged to Dobrá Niva . Later on, it belonged to Banská Štiavnica.

External links
https://web.archive.org/web/20071217080336/http://www.statistics.sk/mosmis/eng/run.html
http://www.e-obce.sk/obec/dubove/dubove.html

Villages and municipalities in Zvolen District